Wadi Najran is one of the largest valleys in the Arabian Peninsula, and its tributaries come from the Sarat mountains and hills surrounding the area. It extends  to the east from its mouth in the plains where it ends in the sands of the Empty Quarter.

The river divides the city of Najran into two parts, causing extensive damage when it floods. It is the main source of water supply for the region and brings large amounts of silt deposited in the plains and flooded farms along its banks Wiczidha fertility. The Najran Valley Dam is located on its course.

References

External links
Najran University 
Najran Map 

Valleys of Saudi Arabia
Najran Province